General elections were held in Malta on 18 and 19 October 1921. The Maltese Political Union emerged as the largest party, winning 14 of the 32 seats in the Legislative Assembly and four of the seven elected seats in the Senate. Joseph Howard became Prime Minister.

Electoral system
Members of the Legislative Assembly were elected using the single transferable vote system, with four members elected in each of the eight districts. Suffrage was limited to men.

Results

Legislative Assembly

Senate

References

General elections in Malta
Malta
1921 in Malta
October 1921 events
Election and referendum articles with incomplete results
1921 elections in the British Empire